Chita Rivera (born Dolores Conchita Figueroa del Rivero Anderson; January 23, 1933), is an American actress, singer and dancer best known for originating roles in Broadway musicals including Anita in West Side Story, Velma Kelly in Chicago, and the title role in Kiss of the Spider Woman. She is a ten-time Tony Award nominee and a three-time Tony Award recipient, including one for Lifetime Achievement. She is the first Latina and the first Latino American to receive a Kennedy Center Honor and is a recipient of the Presidential Medal of Freedom.

Early life and education
Rivera was born in Washington, D.C., the daughter of Katherine (Anderson), a government clerk, and Pedro Julio Figueroa del Rivero, a clarinetist and saxophonist for the United States Navy Band. Her father was Puerto Rican and her mother was of Scottish and Italian descent. Rivera is one of five children. Rivera was seven years old when her mother was widowed and went to work at The Pentagon.

In 1944, Rivera's mother enrolled her in the Jones-Haywood School of Ballet (now the Jones Haywood School of Dance). Later, when she was 15, a teacher from George Balanchine's School of American Ballet visited their studio, and Rivera was one of two students picked to audition in New York City; she was accompanied to the audition by Doris Jones, one of the people who ran the Jones-Haywood School. Rivera's audition was successful, and she was accepted into the school and given a scholarship.

Career

1951-1993
In 1951, Rivera accompanied a friend to the audition for the touring company of Call Me Madam starring Elaine Stritch and ended up winning the role herself. She followed this by landing roles in other Broadway productions such as Guys and Dolls, Can-Can, Mr. Wonderful starring Sammy Davis, Jr., and Seventh Heaven and dancing on The Maurice Chevalier Special in 1956. In 1957, she was cast in the role which was destined to make her a Broadway star, the firebrand Anita in West Side Story.

In 1960, Rivera was nominated for a Tony Award for creating the role of Rose in Bye Bye Birdie opposite Dick Van Dyke. She appeared three times on The Ed Sullivan Show and won raves for her performance on Broadway and in London opposite Peter Marshall, but was passed over for the film version where the role was played by Janet Leigh. In 1963, Rivera was a guest on The Judy Garland Show and was cast opposite Alfred Drake in Zenda. The Broadway-bound musical closed on the road but in 1964, Rivera returned to Broadway in Bajour and television in The Outer Limits.

Among many national tours, Rivera starred most notably in Sweet Charity directed by Bob Fosse, playing the role of Nickie in the film adaptation of Sweet Charity with Shirley MacLaine (1969). Rivera appeared three times on The Hollywood Palace, twice on The Carol Burnett Show (including an episode airing February 22, 1971) and between 1973 and 1974, played Connie Richardson on The New Dick Van Dyke Show. In 1975, Rivera was nominated for a Tony Award starring as Velma Kelly opposite Gwen Verdon in the original cast of the musical Chicago, directed by Bob Fosse. In addition to her ballet instructors, Rivera cites Leonard Bernstein and Verdon, with whom she starred in Chicago, as influential to her success. She later made a cameo appearance in the 2002 movie version. She appeared as Fastrada in a filmed-for-television version of the musical Pippin in 1981, and was nominated for Tony and Drama Desk awards for Bring Back Birdie (1981) and a Tony Award for Merlin (1983) on Broadway.

In 1984, Rivera starred in the Kander and Ebb musical The Rink with Liza Minnelli and won her first Tony and Drama Desk awards for her role as Anna. In 1986, while earning a Tony Award nomination for her performance in the Jerry Herman musical, Jerry's Girls, Rivera was in a severe accident when her car collided with a taxi on West 86th Street in Manhattan. Injuries sustained included the breaking of her left leg in twelve places, requiring eighteen screws and two braces to mend. After rehabilitation, Rivera continued to perform on stage. Recovered, in 1988, she toured the country in Can-Can and got involved in a restaurant venture in partnership with the novelist Daniel Simone. The eatery, located on 42nd Street between 9th and 10th Avenue, was named "Chita's" after her. It soon became a significant attraction for the after-theater crowds and operated until 1994.

1993-present

In 1993, Rivera received Tony and Drama Desk awards for Best Leading Actress in a Musical for her dual portrayal of Aurora and Spider Woman in the musical Kiss of the Spider Woman, written by Kander and Ebb. Rivera later participated in the London edition of Kander and Ebb's long-running revival of Chicago, this time in the role of Roxie Hart. Rivera starred in the Goodman Theatre production of the musical The Visit (also by Kander and Ebb) as Claire Zachanassian in 2001. In 2002, she became a Kennedy Center Honoree. In 2003, Rivera returned to Broadway in the 2003 revival of Nine as Liliane La Fleur and received her eighth career Tony Award nomination (Best Featured Actress in a Musical) and fourth Drama Desk Award nomination (Outstanding Featured Actress in a Musical). She appeared with Antonio Banderas. She later appeared on the revival's cast album.

She guest-starred along with Michele Lee in a February 2005 episode of Will & Grace, and in December of that year, Chita Rivera: The Dancer's Life, a retrospective of her career, opened on Broadway. She received another Tony nomination for her self-portrayal. Though she was expected to reprise her role in a Signature Theatre staging of The Visit in autumn of 2007, that was later postponed to the following season. Instead, she performed at New York's Feinstein's at the Regency supper club in New York for two weeks and, in 2008, appeared in a revised production of The Visit at the Signature Theatre in Arlington, Virginia, co-starring George Hearn. Rivera guest-starred on Disney Channel's Johnny and the Sprites as Queen of All Magical Beings. The episode debuted on March 15, 2008.

In August 2009, US President Barack Obama presented Rivera the Presidential Medal of Freedom. In the 1960s Rivera had recorded two albums, Chita Rivera: Get Me To The Church On Time and And Now I Sing. These early 1960s albums were reissued on CD by Stage Door Records in February 2013. In November 2008, Rivera released her third solo album, And Now I Swing. Rivera performed in a staged concert of The Visit as a benefit at the Ambassador Theatre on November 30, 2011. In 2012, Rivera played "Princess Puffer" in the Broadway revival of The Mystery of Edwin Drood at Studio 54. She was the Grand Marshal of the Puerto Rican Day Parade in New York City on June 9, 2013.

Rivera returned to Broadway in The Visit, the final musical written by John Kander, Fred Ebb and Terrence McNally. The musical opened at the Lyceum Theatre on March 26, 2015, and closed on June 14, 2015. Co-starring Roger Rees, the production was directed by John Doyle and choreographed by Graciela Daniele. Rivera received praise for her performance, and was nominated for a Tony Award, Best Performance by a Leading Actress in a Musical and a Drama Desk Award. The Astaire Awards were rebranded The Chita Rivera Awards for Dance and Choreography in 2017. In 2018, she received a Special Tony Award for Lifetime Achievement. In 2019, Time Out New York named her "one of the best Broadway divas of all time." 

Rivera has been a frequent guest narrator at Disney's Candlelight Processional at Walt Disney World, most recently appearing in the 2021 and 2022 seasons.

Personal life
On December 1, 1957, Rivera married fellow West Side Story dancer Tony Mordente. Her performance was so important for the success of the show that the London production of West Side Story was postponed until she gave birth to the couple's daughter Lisa in 1958. They were divorced in 1966.

She is Roman Catholic.

Select stage credits

Filmography

Film

Television

Awards, nominations and honors
Rivera has been nominated for the Tony Award ten times, as either Best Featured Actress in a Musical or Best Actress in a Musical. This is the current record for the most individual Tony Award nominations, which she shares with Julie Harris.

In 2009, she was presented with the Presidential Medal of Freedom by President Barack Obama.

Rivera was honored as The New Jewish Home's Eight Over Eighty Gala 2016 honoree.

She was awarded an honorary Doctor of Fine Arts degree from the University of Florida in 2018.

Awards

See also

 List of Puerto Ricans
 List of Puerto Rican Presidential Medal of Freedom recipients

Notes

References

Further reading
 2003 Interview with Chita Rivera about West Side Story
 TonyAwards.com Interviews with Chita Rivera

External links
 
 
 
 

1933 births
Living people
American people of Italian descent
American actresses of Puerto Rican descent
American people of Scottish descent
American female dancers
American dancers
American film actresses
American musical theatre actresses
American television actresses
Drama Desk Award winners
Hispanic and Latino American actresses
Kennedy Center honorees
Presidential Medal of Freedom recipients
Special Tony Award recipients
Tony Award winners
20th-century American actresses
21st-century American actresses
Actresses from Washington, D.C.
Dancers from Washington, D.C.
Dancers from New York (state)
Catholics from Washington, D.C.